Acarnania is a region of western Greece. Below is a list of the cities that existed in Acarnania in ancient times.

Cities
Alyzeia founded by Corinthians polis
Ambracia founded by Corinthians 650 BC polis
Ambrakos pre Hellenistic fortress
Amphilochia
Anaktorion founded by Corinthians and Corcyrans 650 BC polis
Ancient Paleros or Palairos polis
Amphilochian Argos  founded by Ambrakians polis
Astakos founded by Corinthians
Coronta
Dioryktos pre Hellenistic settlement
Echinus (Acarnania) polis
Ellomenon pre Hellenistic settlement
Euboia (Acarnania) pre Hellenistic 
Euripus_(Acarnania) polis
Herakleia (Acarnania) polis
Hyporeiai polis
Idomene (polis) pre Hellenistic fortress & sanctuary
Ithaka (polis) polis
Ithoria pre Hellenistic fortress
Korkyra (Acarnania) founded by Corinthians 706 BC
Koronta polis
Kraneia pre Hellenistic fortress
Kranioi polis
Krenai pre Hellenistic
Leukas (polis) or Leucas (Epirus) founded by Corinthians 650 BC polis
Limnaia polis
Matropolis polis
Medion (polis) polis
Metropolis (polis) pre Hellenistic
Nellos pre Hellenistic fortress
Nerikos pre Hellenistic
Nerikos pre Hellenistic fortress
Nesos pre Hellenistic harbour
Nicopolis founded by Octavian founded 31 BC
Oiniadai polis
Olpai pre Hellenistic fortress
Palaerus
Paleis polis
Phara polis
Phoitiai polis
Pronnoi polis
Ptychia pre Hellenistic
Same (polis) polis
Sauria (polis) pre Hellenistic fortress
Sollion or Sollium founded by Corinthians polis
Stratos (polis) polis
Thyrreion polis
Torybeia polis
Zakynthos (polis) founded by Achaians polis

References

Former populated places in Greece
Ancient Acarnania
Ancient Greek archaeological sites in Greece
Archaeological sites in Western Greece